Long-leaved aster is a common name for several plants and may refer to:

Symphyotrichum ascendens, native to western North America
Symphyotrichum robynsianum, native to eastern North America